The Cumberland County Vocational School District is a vocational public school district based in Vineland, serving the vocational and training needs of high school students in ninth through twelfth grades and adults from Cumberland County, New Jersey, United States.

As of the 2020–21 school year, the district, comprised of one school, had an enrollment of 937 students and 80.0 classroom teachers (on an FTE basis), for a student–teacher ratio of 11.7:1.

School
The Cumberland County Technology Education Center relocated for the 2016–17 school year to a  campus in Vineland constructed at a cost of $70 million and located next to Cumberland County College. The school initiated a new full-time high school program involving 240 students who will be part of the initial graduating class of 2020.

Administration
Core members of the district's administration are:
Dr. Dina Rossi, Superintendent
Megan C. Duffield, Business Administrator / Board Secretary

Board of education
The district's board of education is comprised of seven members—the county superintendent of schools and six appointed members—who set policy and oversee the fiscal and educational operation of the district through its administration. As a Type I school district, the board's trustees are appointed by the members of the Cumberland County Board of County Commissioners to serve four-year terms of office on a staggered basis, with either one or two seats up for reappointment each year. The board appoints a superintendent to oversee the day-to-day operation of the district.

References

External links
Cumberland County Vocational School District

School Data for the Cumberland County Vocational School District, National Center for Education Statistics

Vineland, New Jersey
School districts in Cumberland County, New Jersey
Vocational school districts in New Jersey